Marta Moreira (born 29 November 1966) is a Portuguese sprinter. She competed in the women's 4 × 400 metres relay at the 1992 Summer Olympics.

References

1966 births
Living people
Athletes (track and field) at the 1992 Summer Olympics
Portuguese female sprinters
Portuguese female hurdlers
Olympic athletes of Portugal
Place of birth missing (living people)